The Stationary Ark was a documentary television miniseries hosted by zoologist Gerald Durrell on location at his Jersey Zoological Park. It was based on his 1976 book of the same name. The series was produced by Canadian company Nielsen-Ferns and aired from September to December 1975 on CBC Television and TVOntario. Ark on the Move, a follow-up TV series, was also hosted by Gerald Durrell.

Theme song
The theme to Stationary Ark, originally composed by John Mills-Cockell, became popularized in the mid-1980s with a cover version (only very loosely based on the original theme) released by Georg Feil for the Commodore 64 and its SID chip.

References

External links

 Queen's University Directory of CBC Television Series: Stage Door to Switzer, p. 2, accessed 15 June 2019
 Fanfare for a Stationary Ark by John Mills-Cocker (possibly the original?)

Nature educational television series
Gerald Durrell
Television series about animals
CBC Television original programming
TVO original programming